Zsolt Harczi (born 17 February 1967) is a Hungarian table tennis player. He competed in the men's singles event at the 1988 Summer Olympics.

References

External links
 

1967 births
Living people
Hungarian male table tennis players
Olympic table tennis players of Hungary
Table tennis players at the 1988 Summer Olympics
People from Cegléd
Sportspeople from Pest County
20th-century Hungarian people